Louis Lombardi (born January 17, 1968) is an American actor known for his roles in The Sopranos, Fantasy Island, and 24.

Early life 
Lombardi was born in The Bronx, New York City, the son of Louis Lombardi Sr.

Career 
On television, Lombardi had a recurring role on The Sopranos as Agent Skip Lipari, and guest starred on such shows as Chuck,  Entourage, Heroes and CSI.  He was a cast member of a 1990s revival of Fantasy Island and played Edgar Stiles on 24.  He also played Stucky Fein in the short-lived television show Mob City.

He has had roles in films including Beer League, The Usual Suspects, Natural Born Killers, Suicide Kings, Beverly Hills Cop III, The Animal, Spider-Man 2, 3000 Miles to Graceland, The Crew, The Hot Chick, The Spirit, Battleship, and Jersey Boys. He also wrote and directed the film Dough Boys, released in 2008.

Filmography

Film

Television

References

External links
Official website

Biography on FOX.com

1968 births
American male film actors
American male television actors
Living people
Male actors from New York City
American people of Italian descent